Tina S. Kaidanow (born 1965) is a U.S. diplomat and government official. She served as the Acting Assistant Secretary of State for Political-Military Affairs before moving to the United States Department of Defense. From 2008 to 2009, Kaidanow served as United States Ambassador to Kosovo.

Education
Kaidanow earned Bachelor of Arts and Master of Arts degrees from the University of Pennsylvania and another master's degree in political science from Columbia University in New York, as well as a certificate in Russian studies from the Harriman Institute at Columbia.

Career
Kaidanow is a career member of the United States Foreign Service. She has had assignments in Belgrade (1995–1997), Skopje (1998–1999), Sarajevo (1997–1998 and 2003–2006), Pristina (2006–2009), and Kabul (2012–2013), and as well as the United States National Security Council and the Bureau of European and Eurasian Affairs (2009–2011). At the National Security Council, Kaidanow had the position of Director for Southeast European Affairs.

In Skopje, from 1998 to 1999, Kaidanow served as special assistant to United States Ambassador to Macedonia Christopher R. Hill. Kaidanow later became the Deputy Chief of Mission at the U.S. embassy in Sarajevo from 2003 to 2006.

In 2006, Kaidanow became the Chargé d'Affaires for the U.S. Office in Pristina. In 2008, the Republic of Kosovo declared independence from Serbia, and was subsequently recognized by the United States. The new U.S. embassy in Pristina opened, with Kaidanow as the first United States Ambassador to Kosovo.

From August 2009 to June 2011, Kaidanow served as a Deputy Assistant Secretary of State for European and Eurasian Affairs, and then served as the bureau's Principal Deputy Assistant Secretary until 2012. From September 2012 to October 2013, Kaidanow served as the DCM at the U.S. embassy in Kabul, Afghanistan. In this capacity, according to Politico, she vetoed a plan to prosecute Taliban commanders and their drug lord allies in U.S. courts for drug trafficking, because of concerns about the country's political stability.

Kaidanow served as the Coordinator for Counterterrorism from February 2014 to February 2016. In February 2016, Kaidanow moved to the Bureau of Political-Military Affairs as the Principal Deputy Assistant Secretary.

On September 25, 2018, Kaidanow was appointed as a senior advisor for international cooperation in the Office of the Under Secretary of Defense for Acquisition and Sustainment. She resigned on December 16, 2019, and will leave the Pentagon January 10, 2020.

References

External links

|-

|-

1965 births
Living people
Ambassadors of the United States to Kosovo
Columbia Graduate School of Arts and Sciences alumni
United States Assistant Secretaries of State
University of Pennsylvania alumni
Place of birth missing (living people)
Date of birth missing (living people)
21st-century American diplomats
United States Foreign Service personnel
United States Ambassadors-at-Large
American women ambassadors
Ambassadors of the United States
21st-century American women